Astronomica: The Quest for the Edge of the Universe is an educational game made by Hyper-Quest, Inc. in 1994 for Macintosh and Windows 3.x. The game developers purposely made the game's main character a girl, explaining "Younger girls are often left out of multimedia games, so we made the main character in Astronomica a girl".

Synopsis
Game play centers around the player searching for a missing employee SkyQuest AstroLab, an astronomer that was working on a supercomputer named Astronomica prior to his disappearance. Players must solve several puzzles based on space trivia to progress.

Reception
Critical reception for Astronomica has been mixed, with many outlets criticizing its difficulty of game play. Entertainment Weekly rated the game a C+, writing "Ultimately, Astronomica does little more than familiarize players with basic space terms. Despite some sloppy production values (such as the director’s audible ”Action!”), the game does offer a reference encyclopedia and detailed planetary photographs science buffs will appreciate." The Washington Post'''' was also critical of the game, as they felt it was "low-budget programming and design, pure and simple".Computer Shopper was more positive, commenting "with some of the slickest photo-realistic 3-D images around, it's as much a feast for the eyes as for the brain."

References

External links Astronomica: The Quest for the Edge of the Universe'' at MobyGames

1994 video games
Science educational video games
Classic Mac OS games
Puzzle video games
Video games developed in the United States
Video games featuring female protagonists
Windows games